Manda and the Marbles were a pop punk/ new wave band from Columbus, Ohio.

History 
Many grown-up children of the '80s have a special place in their hearts for ladies such as the Go-Go's, Bananarama, and Kim "Kids in America" Wilde. Their music was pouty, awash in lip gloss and hairspray, and absolutely irresistible. Their songs made pining and heartache sound like so much friggin' fun. Finally, the valley girl woes have a new poster girl: Manda Marble. Manda and the Marbles are a Columbus, Ohio trio whose songs mirror those of sassy female-fronted pop bands – sunny surf rhythms and rather forlorn subject matter.

Jeanne Fury, Review of Manda and The Marbles, NY Rock Confidential, March, 2003

Who is Manda you might ask? Well just take the best of the Go-Go's, Berlin, and your favorite girl-fronted 80's new wave pop band...that's Manda. This will be the soundtrack to many a summer. Prepare to have your hearts broken.

Punk Updates, October 15, 2002, in relation to release of More Seduction

Founded in 1997, the group produced four albums: Rock's Not Dead, Seduction, More Seduction, and Angels With Dirty Faces. The band was originally a three-piece featuring Manda Marble on vocals and bass, Joe A. Damage on guitar, and Mark Slak on drums. Work on their most recent album featured keyboardist Elias Dubok,  2001 was the band's breakout year; they played at the CMJ Music Marathon and later signed with Go-Kart Records.

The Marbles were the first band to release a song using podcasting and were heralded for this achievement on MTV and the BBC.  While the band's latest album, Angels With Dirty Faces (to which the podcast distribution related), released on September 17, 2002, was well-received, the label to which it had been licensed, Addison Records, ceased operations within a short time after the album's 2005 release.

Following guitarist Joe A. Damage's departure in late 2005, the band's activity slowed considerably.  In 2008, Manda Marble and Mark Slak recorded a new demo and posted it on their MySpace page, but nothing has been heard since.  The band website (www.marthaandthemarbles.com) is also inactive.

Manda and the Marbles' music was featured in several motion pictures, including the low budget thriller Creepies (2003) and the 1980s throwback Nail Polish (2006). Their music also appeared on the MTV show Rich Girls (2003-2004), and the band's image and name were shown in the film Come Away Home (2005).

Discography

Albums 
 1999 Rock's Not Dead  Break Up Records
 2001 Seduction  Break Up Records
 2002 More Seduction   Go-Kart Records (Remastered Seduction, with four new songs)
 2005 Angels With Dirty Faces Sickhouse Records, licensed to Addison Records

Compilation Contributions 
 2002 Fields and Streams Kill Rock Stars Records. "New tracks by 45 indie artists", including "Sex Object" by Manda and The Marbles.

References

External links 
 Manda and The Marbles on Myspace

Pop punk groups from Ohio